Pingua is a village in Dhenkanal district, Odisha, India.

Pingua is a village situated alongside of the Bramhani River bank. Fertile farm lands, innocents peoples, marvelous culture and Eco friendly  environment make this village and surrounding villages an example to others. Khandaandha, Puruna Amanga and Toloro Passi are the main neighbouring villages.
Pingua is a Village in Gondia Tehsil in Dhenkanal District of Odisha, India. It is located 48 km towards East from District headquarters Dhenkanal. 16 km from Gondia.35 km from jajpur road.48 km from Cuttack. 72 km from State capital Bhubaneswar

Pingua Pin code is 759016 and postal office at pingua.

Kasipur ( 5 km ), Nihal Prasad ( 6 km ), Bega ( 8 km ), Laulai ( 8 km ), Mrudanga ( 10 km ) are the nearby Villages to Pingua. Pingua is surrounded by Sukinda Tehsil towards North, Dahrmasala Tehsil towards East, Bhuban Tehsil towards west, Rasulpur Tehsil towards East .

Bhuban, Byasanagar, Dhenkanal, Duburi, Jajapur are the nearby Cities to Pingua.	

The majority of this village is covered with Cultivating land. The principal forest products of the village are timber, bamboo, firewood and kendu leaf, and medicinal herbs and plants.

The Jagar Jatra (Maha Shivaratri) is a famous festival celebrated here in the winter season.

History
Pingua was a river valley civilisation near the banks of Brahmani river. The main reason for choosing an area near river bank was the ease of doing business of its traditional oil, textile, metal works, agricultural products and soil arts. Pingua was a zamindari area in eastern part of Dhenkanal District. The Brahmani River flowed on the northern part of the village.  The population of Pingua was around 900 in 1880 as per the British Census. The rulers of Dhenkanal used to come here for searching of medicinal plants.

Neighbouring districts
 Keonjhar district in the North,
 Cuttack district in the South,
 Jajpur district in the East and
 Angul district in the West.

Topography
The Geographical area of Pingua can be divided into three natural divisions:
 Hilly region.
 The river valley.
 Plane region.

This village has mainly five varieties of soil:
 Alluvial soil
 Red loam soil
 Sandy loan soil
 Gravelly soil
 Cleaving loan soil

Famous villages around Pingua
Tolorpasi
Nihalprasad
 Goda
 Duburi
 Sadangi
 Manjuripada
 Bhuban
 Joranda
 Kalanda
 Khankira
 Nabakashipur
 Gondia
Kabatabandha

Economy
Some large and medium scale industries have established their base far from the village. Some of them are
 Tata Steel Ltd.
Navabharat Ferro Alloys Ltd.
 Nilachal Refractories ltd.
 Utkal Asbestos Ltd.
 Orissa Polyfibres Ltd
 Reliance Industries Limited
 B.Samal & Company Ltd. (Manufacturers of handmade Bidis and Gudakhu; a traditional toothpaste)
 Shakti Sugars Private Ltd
 Bhusan Steel & Strip Ltd.
 Utkal Spinning Mill, Govindpur
 BRG Steel Pvt. Ltd
 GMR Energy LTD, Kamalanga Thermal Power Plant
 Lanco Babandh Power Ltd

Health
Pingua Medical
C.H.C., Barpada
 S.C.B. Medical College, Cuttack
 District Headquarters Hospital

Transport

Air
Bhubaneswar, the nearest airport (80 km) is connected to Ahmedabad, New Delhi, Hyderabad, Kolkata, Mumbai, Bangalore, Raipur, Goa, Srinagar, Chennai, Vishakhapatnam, Bagdogra, Coimbatore, and Port Blair.

Train
Cuttack (55 km), on the main Howrah Chennai route, links Dhenkanal to New Delhi, Mumbai, Ahmedabad, Kolkata, Chennai, Hyderabad, Bangalore, Trivandrum, Guwahati and Puri. Dhenkanal is also directly connected to Delhi, Ahmedabad, Vizag, Raipur and Mumbai.

Culture
This region is inhabited mostly by Hindus.

Cuisine
 Rice, dal and vegetables are the staple food of the local people.
 Special non-vegetarian delicacies includes entrees composed of fish, prawn and meat. Dalma (a mix of vegetables and pulses) and saag (leafy vegetables) are the vegetarian delicacies.
 Typical sweets include chhenapoda, chhena Jhili, rasabali, rasagola (all made from milk) and pitha (cakes).
 Pingua is very famous for its Chhenapoda.

Tourism
Kapilash Temple
Situated in the south west corner of Pingua village, 35 km from the village. The temples is situated at about 2239 feet above sea level. Narasinghdeva-I constructed the temple for Sri Chandrasekhar in 1246 CE. The temple has a wooden Jagamohana. The deities of Sri Ganesh, Kartikeya, Gangadevi, etc. are found in the temple. Patita Pavana Jaganath also remain in the temple as Parsa Deva. Lord Biswanath temple is also situated in Kapilas. According to some scholars this temple is older than the Chandrasekhar Jew temple, hence it is known as Budha Linga. There are many legends about Kapilas pitha and its significance.
 Saptasajya
One can proceed 12 km in the Sankarpur road after reaching at Dhenkanal Bus stop and then turn west at the Badagila chowk and pass 2 km to reach Saptyasajya, a place of scenic beauty, where the holy temple of Maryada Purusottama Sri Ramachandra is located at about 900 feet at the hilltop. A mountain stream flows down as if touching his holy feet in veneration. Mythologically this place is important and legends abound. Its name is Sapta Sajya because, there are seven hills surrounding the area. Another facet behind the naming of this place is that, the Saptarashi had their ashramas here in this place. There is also a mythological story, that, Sri Ram during his exile or Vanabasha had spent seven days in this beautiful spot. Secondly, the Pandavas during their 12 years of exile and one year of Agyanta Vasa had chosen this mountains for shelter. The State Government had constructed the Pucca road in 1982. Inside the temple complex Maa Annapurna temple was constructed in 1982, the 1st floor Kalki temple in 1985, the Surya Narayan temple in 1990. Now the temple of Sri Rameswaram Shiva, Sri Ganesh, Sri Mahavir, and the Nabagrah Temple with each room for each graha are found. Mahakali, Mata Saraswati, Sri Nrushingha temple are conceived to be built in the holy complex. This scenic spot has become a good tourist and picnic spot where thousands of tourists and devotees gather from different corners of Odisha and India.
Baba Budhadia Temple
It is situated in the North side of Pingua village, 0.5 km from the village. The temple is called ବାବା ବୁଢାଦିଅ଼଼ଂ ମନ୍ଦିର. According to village mythology, Baba protects village from problems. At night Baba roams around village to provide security, surveillance, prosperity to every people. It is a belief that Baba fulfils all desire and dreams whoever calls Baba. There are a beautiful temple, a picnic spot and a park around the temple. Around the temple there are many varieties of medicinal plants available which attracts the people from all parts of Odisha. The temple is centre of attraction in April month of every year as during Makar Sankranti a Yajna is conducted there.

Places of interest in and around pingua
 Joranda
This place is 35 km. from Pingua, which is famous as the religious headquarters of 'Mahima Dharma', the only religious cult started from Odisha. Joranda houses the samadhi of Mahima Gosain, the preacher and propounder of the Mahima Cult. The other sacred temples are the Sunya Mandira, Dhuni Mandira and Gadi Mandira. Pilgrims in large numbers pour forth to Joranda fair held on full-moon day of Magha which falls in January–February every year. All of the principal texts of the religion like the Stuti Chintaamani were composed by Bhima Bhoi. This is mainly celebrated by the religious people belonging to the Alekh/Mahima dharma.

Since 1874, this unique festival has been held every year. Mahima Swami can be credited for this great fair. Every year the people belong to Mahima religion gather here to celebrate their annual function, termed as Joranda Fair. The devotees from each nook and corners of Odisha come to this place to discover calmness in their life and how to achieve nirvana (Swarg) after death.

According to the devotees they pray altogether to their God by reciting Alekh Brahma and burn ghee in Jajnan Kund to being peace back into the earth's life. They believe that this devotion will provide pureness to earth and fulfill all the basic needs people cherish in their day-to-day life.

 Sarang
67 km. from Dhenkanal, 23 km from Angul and 3 km. from Talcher one finds the Anantasayan image of Lord Vishnu on the rocky bed of the river Brahmani at Saranga. The hoods of Ananta, the serpent king spread over the head of Lord Vishnu as the crown and cover. The primal lotus, housing Brahma, the creator, originates from Vishnu's naval, the supreme being enjoys deep delight of his cosmic sleep in the water of the river Brahmani.

Education
School and Colleges :-
Pingua Nodal U.P. School / Pingua M.E. School
Pingua Patana School
Pingua High School
Shree Jagannath Mahavidyalaya
Pingua Degree College

Pingua is home to the literate students, studying in Indian Institute of Technology, Bombay, NITs, BPUTs, Ravenshaw University, OUAT, etc.

Other colleges, universities, and institutes include:
 Synergy Institute of Engineering & Technology
 Indira Gandhi Institute of Technology
 Dhenkanal College
 Institute of Professional Engineering & Technology

External links
 

Villages in Dhenkanal district